Hanny may refer to:

First name:
 Hanny Kellner (1892-?), Austrian diver who competed in the 1912 Olympics
 Hanny Michaelis (1922–2007), Dutch poet
 Hanny Mohammed, a member of the Australian power metal band Black Majesty
 Hanny Nahmias (born 1959), Israeli singer, actress, writer and television personality
 Hanny Saputra (born 1965), Indonesian director

Nickname:
 Johanna Allston (born 1986), Australian orienteer

Surname:
 Frank Hanny (1896-1947), American National Football League player
 John R. Hanny, American chef and author

See also
 Hannay (disambiguation)